Beinn Dhorain (628 m) is a mountain in the Northwest Highlands. It lies in Sutherland in the far north of Scotland, west of the village of Helmsdale.A rounded sandstone peak, it rises steeply above Glen Loth.

References

Mountains and hills of the Northwest Highlands
Marilyns of Scotland
Grahams